Reading Blue Mountain and Northern Railroad 2102 (historically known as Reading 2102) is a preserved "T-1" 4-8-4 "Northern" type steam locomotive. Originally built by Baldwin in 1925 as an "I-10sa" 2-8-0 "Consolidation" type locomotive for the Reading Company, No. 2102 was rebuilt by the Reading's own locomotive Shops as a 4-8-4 "Northern" in 1945, and it was used for pulling heavy coal trains for the railroad until being retired from revenue service in 1956. Between 1962 and 1964, No. 2102 was used to pull the famous Iron Horse Rambles excursion trains. After the Rambles ended in 1964, No. 2102 was sold to Steam Tours Inc. of Akron, Ohio to spend the next 23 years pulling various fan trips in the Northeast, Mid-Atlantic and Midwest. In 1985, it was sold again to Andy Muller to operate on his Reading Blue Mountain and Northern Railroad alongside 4-6-2 "Pacific" No. 425, until its flue ticket expired in 1991. In February 2016, the locomotive was restored to operating condition and returned to service in April 2022.

History

Revenue service and first retirement (1923–1956)
By the end of the 1920s, the Philadelphia and Reading Company had approximately 1,015 class "I" 2-8-0 "Consolidation" types constructed by the Baldwin Locomotive Works in Philadelphia, Pennsylvania, as well as the Reading's own locomotive shops in Reading. One of those classes of 2-8-0s was the I-10sa class, and No. 2102 was one of the first I-10sa locomotives built in 1923, being numbered 2044 at the time. No. 2044 was solely used for heavy freight service on the Reading's Branch lines, and sometimes, on the Main line. When the Reading was looking for even heavier and more-powerful locomotives during the end of World War II, they brought thirty of their Consolidations Nos 2020–2049, including No. 2044, into its locomotive shops in Reading. There, No. 2044 was heavily rebuilt into a 4-8-4 "Northern", and was reclassified as a T-1, being renumbered to 2102. Its four-axle tender was replaced with a larger six-axle tender, its boiler was extended, its driving wheel diameter was increased, it received two extra pilot wheels, and it received four trailing wheels to support its enlarged firebox. No. 2102 was reassigned for mainline freight service only, just as the rest of its rebuilt sister locomotives were.                                                                           

As the Reading discontinued steam operations in 1956, No. 2102 was retired from revenue service, and shortly afterward, it was sold to Carpenter Steel Corporation for use to provide steam for its plant.

First restoration and excursion career (1962–1991)
In the Fall of 1960, the Carpenter Steel plant suffered a catastrophic fire, badly damaging No. 2102's steam generator. After that, No. 2102 was sold back to the Reading Company, which one year prior had decided to spare a few of its T-1s from the scrapper's torch for use on their final excursion fan trips between Wayne Junction in Philadelphia and Shamokin, known as the "Iron Horse Rambles". After its extensive overhaul was completed on April 29, 1962, No. 2102 would join fellow T-1 No. 2100 and replace No. 2124, which was sold to Steamtown, U.S.A. after breaking-down. It would also perform doubleheaders with No. 2100. In 1964, the Rambles were put to an end, and by January 31, 1965, the last remaining T-1s were sold separately, and No. 2102 was sold off to Steam Tours, Inc., based in Akron, Ohio and led by Bill Benson. Beginning in 1966, No. 2102 would operate in the Northeast, Mid-Atlantic, and Midwest areas of the country. Its main storage site under Steam Tours' ownership would be at Milwaukee Junction in Detroit, Michigan, which was the same location where Grand Trunk Western USRA 4-6-2 “Pacific” No. 5629 was occasionally stored. In 1968, though, No. 2102 ran an excursion on Grand Trunk Western trackage when a minor derailment damaged its Hennesey oil lubricators on the second driving axle, and the lubricator was subsequently converted to a grease block. The locomotive sat idle for the next three years.

In April 1971, No. 2102 was brought back out of storage for use on an inaugural run along the Greenbrier River from Ronceverte to Cass, West Virginia, as a novel way of letting tourists connect to the remote Cass Scenic Railroad. In 1972, Ross Rowland's High Iron Company (HICO) sponsored several excursions from Reading to Harrisburg on the Reading's mainline to recreate the Iron Horse Rambles, and No. 2102 was loaned to HICO to be used to pull the trains.

In 1973, during the sesquicentennial of the Delaware and Hudson Railway (D&H), No. 2102 was sent to the D&H's Colonie, New York shops to masquerade as D&H K-62 4-8-4 No. 302, with smoke deflectors, a recessed headlight, raised "bug eye" marker lights and a D&H-style number board. In April, the locomotive performed a 2-day double-headed excursion with Canadian Pacific 4-6-2 No. 1278, which masqueraded as D&H No. 653 at the time, from Albany, New York to Montreal, Quebec in Canada. For the rest of 1973, No. 302 pulled various excursions sponsored by HICO from Hoboken, New Jersey to Binghamton, New York, and excursions sponsored by Steam Tours between Pittsburgh and Shawmut. In 1974, No. 2102 was sold again to another Ohio tourist group, the Allegheny Railroad, and the group gave No. 2102 an overhaul that would last until 1977. During that process, No. 2102 was reverted to its Reading appearance, but it was re-lettered to "Allegheny".

Shortly after the overhaul was completed, No. 2102 performed a doubleheader along the famous Horseshoe Curve with Grand Trunk Western 2-8-2 No. 4070. However, that trip was plagued with mechanical issues; while on the curve, No. 4070 threw an eccentric rod, and the busy line where the train sat had to be shut down for several hours. As a result of this, Conrail banned steam operations for the next several years. Soon, the 2102 was overhauled, again by volunteers at the Monongahela Railway's locomotive shops in Brownsville. On September 22, 1983, the 2102 was fired up and was used to pull a freight train south of Pittsburgh, and footage of it was recorded specifically for the 1984 romance film Maria's Lovers, starring Nastassja Kinski, John Savage and Robert Mitchum, and directed by Andrei Konchalovsky.

In September 1985, under the lease of the Reading Company Technical and Historical Society, No. 2102 travelled to the ex-Reading locomotive shops to commemorate the 40th anniversary of the debut of the Reading T-1 class. Andrew J. Muller, Jr., owner of the Blue Mountain and Reading Regional railroad (BM&R), brought his steam locomotive for the event as well: Ex-Gulf, Mobile and Northern 4-6-2 "Pacific" No. 425, which had recently been restored for the BM&R in 1983. During the event, Andy Muller, who had always dreamed of owning a Reading T-1, made the financially distressed owners of No. 2102 an offer they could not refuse, and he purchased No. 2102 at an undisclosed cost. No. 2102 then operated more mainline excursions on the BM&R, Conrail and Gettysburg trackage. The locomotive also performed one doubleheader with No. 425 in 1988. Between December 1986 and 1987, No. 2102's tender was given the bold lettering “We the People of Reading and Berks County PA celebrate Constitution Day” to pay homage to the bicentennial of the United States Constitution.

Second retirement (1991–2016)                                                                                                                                                                       
No. 2102's last run in the 20th century occurred on October 27, 1991, after pulling a special 12-car train called "The Anthracite Express" to Tamaqua, in celebration of the 160th anniversary of the opening of the Little Schuylkill Navigation Railroad. After the event was over, No. 2102 was taken out of service and was due for another overhaul.

On September 25, 1995, No. 2102 was moved to Steamtown National Historic Site in Scranton, Pennsylvania, when Muller made a deal to use its facilities in exchange for Steamtown to use his locomotives to run excursions whenever they were operable. No. 2102 was moved to the working stall at Steamtown's roundhouse two years later. The locomotive was disassembled beginning in January 1998 with the jacketing, shielding, and ornamentation removed from the boiler, and the handles and gauges removed from the cab. On June 26 of the same year, No. 2102 was reassembled and was moved back to the RBM&N's headquarters of Port Clinton, where the railroad's own locomotive shop was under construction. For the next seventeen years, No. 2102 would remain in storage out of public view inside the Port Clinton shop, but occasionally, it would be brought outside for static display in front of the RBM&N station in Temple.

Second restoration (2016–2022)                                                                                                                                                                                                                                                                                                                                                                                                                                                               
In January 2016, the RBMN started a mechanical evaluation of the locomotive, with the goal of restoring the locomotive to operation. Muller spent hundreds of thousands of dollars to rebuild the locomotive, with additional funds raised through ticket sales. The inside firebox sheets were replaced, 729 stay bolts were either replaced or repaired, and all flues and tubes were taken out. The rear support was also replaced after an unrepaired crack was discovered.

By the end of 2020, the refurbishment of the boiler was nearing completion. On January 10, 2021, No. 2102 was fired up for the first time in the 21st century and tested at its  working pressure. All components, including the boiler, injectors, feedwater heater, and stoker, were found to be in good working order. While the locomotive was still not ready to run yet, as the cab still needed to be reinstalled, and since its tender was still being repaired, No. 2102 was using No. 425's tender for the test-fire. The multi-year project has cost more than $1 million, and Muller says that he expects to spend another $100,000 for completion.

Second excursion career (2022–present) 
In early April 2022, the restoration work of No. 2102 has been completed as the locomotive moved under its own power for the first time in 31 years and began making test runs to Reading, Tamaqua, and Jim Thorpe, Pennsylvania. On April 26, No. 2102 performed another test run from Reading to Jim Thorpe, pulling a long line of fifty hopper cars. On May 20, the final test run was made from Reading to Tamaqua with 100 hopper cars. On May 28, it entered excursion service to haul the first Iron Horse Ramble excursion from Reading to Jim Thorpe, Pennsylvania with 19 sold-out passenger cars without diesel assistance. Afterwards, the locomotive pulled more Iron Horse Ramble excursions on July 2, and on August 13, it double headed with No. 425 for the first time since 1988. On August 19, 2102 pulled revenue freight services again and pulled the final Iron Horse Ramble excursion on September 3. On October 1, 2022, No. 2102 pulled its first Autumn Leaf excursion, but was sidelined on October 8 due to firebox issues, which was repaired four days later in time to continue pulling the remaining scheduled Autumn Leaf excursions on October 29 and November 6, 2022.

Gallery

See also 
 Reading 1251
 Reading 1187
 Central Railroad of New Jersey 113
 Chesapeake and Ohio 614
 Norfolk and Western 611

References

Bibliography

Further reading

External links 

 Reading Blue Mountain and Northern Official Website

Individual locomotives of the United States
4-8-4 locomotives
Baldwin locomotives
Philadelphia and Reading Railroad locomotives
Freight locomotives
2102
Standard gauge locomotives of the United States
Preserved steam locomotives of Pennsylvania
Railway locomotives introduced in 1925